Markham—Unionville is a provincial electoral district in Ontario, Canada, that has been represented in the Legislative Assembly of Ontario since the 2007 provincial election.

History
Markham—Unionville is located in the province of Ontario, and covers suburban areas north of Toronto. It was created in 2003 from Markham.

It consists of the part of the city of Markham south of a line drawn from the southern limit of the city north on Highway 404, east along 16th Avenue, south along McCowan Road, east along Highway 7, and south along 9th Line to the southern limit of the city.

In the 2018 election, incumbent Michael Chan did not run for re-election. Liberal candidate Amanda Yeung Collucci, a sitting Markham councillor, drew attention for campaign signs that omitted her party's name and logo, and for a Facebook post in 2012 suggesting that the 9/11 terror attacks was an inside job.

Members of Provincial Parliament

Election results

2007 electoral reform referendum

Sources

Elections Ontario Past Election Results

Ontario provincial electoral districts
Politics of Markham, Ontario